Blatnice is a municipality and village in Plzeň-North District in the Plzeň Region of the Czech Republic. It has about 900 inhabitants.

Etymology
The name is derived from Czech word bláto (i.e. "mud").

History
The first written mention of Blatnice is from 1379.

Blatnice was annexed to Nazi Germany in 1938 and administered as part of Reichsgau Sudetenland. After the World War II, its German-speaking population was expelled.

Notable people
Werner Krieglstein (born 1941), professor, philosopher, author and actor

References

Villages in Plzeň-North District